Careproctus shigemii is a species of snailfish found near Hokkaido, Japan.

The fish is named in honor of a fisherman of Rausu, Hokkaido, Japan, Shigemi Fujimoto.

References

Liparidae
Fish of Japan
Fish described in 2020